Blasius Laubich (died 1608) was a Roman Catholic prelate who served as Auxiliary Bishop of Passau (1604–1608).

Biography
On 24 Nov 1604, Blasius Laubich was appointed during the papacy of Pope Clement VIII as Auxiliary Bishop of Passau and Titular Bishop of Symbalia. On 4 Dec 1604, he was consecrated bishop by Wolfgang von Hausen, Bishop of Regensburg, with Bartholomäus Scholl, Auxiliary Bishop of Freising, and Marcus Lyresius, Auxiliary Bishop of Eichstätt, serving as co-consecrators. He served as Auxiliary Bishop of Passau until his death on 5 Feb 1608.

References 

17th-century Roman Catholic bishops in Bavaria
Bishops appointed by Pope Clement VIII
1608 deaths